Sergey Mikhaylovich Darkin (b. December 9, 1963 in Bolshoy Kamen, Primorsky Krai) is the former Governor of Primorsky Krai, Russia.

Biography
Darkin attended school in Artyom and later in Vesyoly Yar settlement. After graduating from school he entered the Far Eastern Naval College and simultaneously started work as a docker in the port of Vladivostok. He graduated from the college with high honors in 1985 and chose to continue with graduate studies. Having completed graduate studies he worked as a stevedore in Vladivostok port.

In 1989 he became deputy director of the Dallizing joint stock company. In 1991 he founded the Roliz company. The company's activities included shipbuilding and later fishing. In 1998 Darkin also became president of the Primorye Bank. He remained president of Roliz until his election as Governor of Primorsky Krai in 2001.

On May 27, 2001, in the first round of the governorship elections, Darkin received the largest number of votes cast (24%); under the electoral law this was insufficient, however, for him to be elected without a second round of voting. In the run-off election held on June 17, 2001 Darkin obtained a share of the vote of 40.17%. He was sworn in as Governor of Primorsky Krai on June 25, 2001 in succession to Governor Yevgeny Ivanovich Nazdratenko, who resigned on February 5, 2001 after imperative request of the President Putin and having a heart attack.

In January 2005, according to the new law of appointing the governors of the Russian federal subjects, Darkin became the first governor in Russia appointed to his post by the President of Russia. He held this position until 2010, when a new governor, Vladimir Miklushevsky was appointed.

The governor has three daughters (one of whom was adopted). His youngest daughter, Yaroslava Darkina, was born on April 8, 2001, the day on which Darkin submitted his request to be registered as a candidate in the governorship elections.

Sergey Darkin's hobbies include volleyball, scuba diving, fisticuffs, and hunting.

External links
.

1963 births
Living people
People from Bolshoy Kamen
Governors of Primorsky Krai
Mordvin people